South Hammond is a planned South Shore Line rail station in Hammond, Indiana. Constructed as part of the West Lake Corridor project, it is expected to open to revenue service in 2025. It will feature a 1,000-space park and ride lot and is adjacent to the Monon Trail.

References

Hammond, Indiana
South Shore Line stations in Indiana
Railway stations in Lake County, Indiana
Railway stations scheduled to open in 2025
Former Monon Railroad stations